The Fatherless is a 2011 Austrian drama film written and directed by Marie Kreutzer. It is Kreutzer's debut film and it won a Special Mention at the 2011 Berlin International Film Festival.

Cast
 Andreas Kiendl as Vito
 Andrea Wenzl as Kyra
 Emily Cox as Mizzi
 Philipp Hochmair as Niki
 Marion Mitterhammer as Anna
 Sami Loris as Miguel
 Pia Hierzegger as Sophie
 Johannes Krisch as Hans
 Axel Sichrovsky as Ossi

References

External links
 

2011 films
2010s German-language films
2011 drama films
2011 directorial debut films
Austrian drama films